The Family Chantel is an American reality television show that airs on TLC and follows the adventures of American Chantel Everett, her Dominican husband Pedro Jimeno, and their immediate families as they navigate an intercultural marriage. It is the first spin-off series of 90 Day Fiancé that follows an individual couple.

Production
Season one premiered on July 22, 2019. The series was renewed for a second season, which premiered on October 12, 2020. Season three premiered on October 11, 2021. Season four premiered on June 6, 2022.

Premise
After Chantel and Pedro fell in love on Chantel's trip to the Dominican Republic and secretly got engaged, Pedro then went to Atlanta, Georgia, on a K-1 visa, where he and Chantel now live. Their story is documented on season four of 90 Day Fiancé. The couple later starred on 90 Day Fiancé: Happily Ever After?. The Family Chantel follows Chantel and Pedro as they work through family drama.

Cast
The show stars Pedro Jimeno, Chantel Everett, Karen Everett, Thomas Everett, Riverknight Everett, and Winter Everett. Pedro's mother and sister, Lydia Morel and Nicole Jimeno, also appear on the show.

Main

Recurring

Episodes

Series overview

Season 1 (2019)

Season 2 (2020)

Season 3 (2021)

Season 4 (2022)

See also
90 Day Fiancé
90 Day Fiancé: Happily Ever After?

References

2010s American reality television series
2019 American television series debuts
American television spin-offs
English-language television shows
Reality television spin-offs
Television series about families
Television shows set in North America
TLC (TV network) original programming